The Calgary International Reggae Festival is an annual event in Calgary, Alberta, Canada that is organized by the Calgary Reggae Festival Society.

Featuring a mixture of local and international reggae acts, the festival has taken place every year since 2004. Starting as a one-day event, by 2008 it had expanded to a ten-day festival. The festival was co-founded by Leo Cripps, the host of CJSW-FM's Caribbean Link-Up show, and from an early stage it was sponsored by radio station Vibe 98.5.

The 2014 event was headlined by Third World.

This festival went on hiatus in 2020 & will return in 2021.

Festivals

See also

List of reggae festivals
List of festivals in Canada
Music of Canada

References

External links

Reggae festivals in Canada
Music festivals in Calgary
Music festivals established in 2004